PP-13 (Rawalpindi-VIII) is a Constituency of Provincial Assembly of Punjab.

2008—2013: PP-8 (Rawalpindi-VIII)
General elections were held on 18 February 2008. Mrs. Umar Farooq won this seat with 30600 votes.

All candidates receiving over 1,000 votes are listed here.

2013-2018:PP-8 (Rawalpindi-VIII)
General elections were held on 11 May 2013. Malik Taimoor Masood won this seat with 49876 votes.

All candidates receiving over 1,000 votes are listed here.

2018-2023 PP-13 (Rawalpindi-VIII) 
From 2018 PP-8 (Rawalpindi-VIII) Become PP-13 Rawalpindi-VIII With Some changes has follow (a) Gorakh Pur Qanungo Halqas of Rawalpindi Tehsil (b)The following Qanungo Halqas of Chaklala Cantonment (1) Charge No.4,(2) Morgah (3) Kotha Kalan (4) Topi and (5) Chaklala-I of Rawalpindi District.

General elections are scheduled to be held on 25 July 2018.

See also
 PP-12 Rawalpindi-VI
 PP-14 Rawalpindi-VIII

References

External links
 Election commission Pakistan's official website
 Awazoday.com check result
 Official Website of Government of Punjab

R